Piz Mundin is a mountain of the Samnaun Alps, located between Samnaun and Martina in the Swiss canton of Graubünden. With an elevation of 3,146 metres above sea level, Piz Mundin is one of the highest summits in the Samnaun Alps.

References

External links
 Piz Mundin on Hikr

Mountains of Switzerland
Mountains of Graubünden
Mountains of the Alps
Alpine three-thousanders
Samnaun
Valsot